Philip Wenman may refer to:

Philip Wenman, 3rd Viscount Wenman (1610–1686), MP for Oxfordshire
Philip Wenman, 6th Viscount Wenman (1719–1760) 
Philip Wenman, 7th Viscount Wenman (1742–1800)